giovanni singleton is an American poet. She won the California Book Award for Poetry. She won the Stephen E. Henderson Award. She founded  nocturnes (re)view of the literary arts.

Life 
She grew up in Richmond, Virginia.

She graduated from American University and New College of California. She taught at Saint Mary’s College of California, Naropa University, New Mexico State University, and University of California, Berkeley.

Works 

 American letters : works on paper  Canarium Books (2017) 
 Ascension Counterpath Press, (2011),  
 Vertical clearance : a sentence,  Spare Tire Press, 1995.
 Fa th er mo th er : an American story, Nocturnes Editions, 1999.

References

External links 

 JOYFUL NOISE: A CONVERSATION WITH GIOVANNI SINGLETON Pen America, September 30, 2011
 White Space and Slowing Down: Poet giovanni singleton Gonzaga University, April 18, 2019

American poets
Living people
Year of birth missing (living people)